Rito may refer to:
Rito (language) also called Luto and Lutos, language of people in the southwestern part of Chad and across the border in the northern part of the Central African Republic
A male equivalent for the given name Rita
Rito (The Legend of Zelda), an avian race in The Legend of Zelda video game series
Rito Revolto, a character from Power Rangers
Rito Yuuki, character from the anime and manga To-Love-Ru
Riot Games, nickname

See also
El Rito (disambiguation)